Dirk Franciscus "Danny" Blind (born 1 August 1961) is a Dutch former football player and coach. He played as a defender for Sparta Rotterdam, Ajax and the Netherlands national team. As coach he has managed Ajax and the Netherlands national team. 

He is one of only two Dutch players, together with Arnold Mühren, to have won all UEFA club competitions.

Playing career

Club career
Blind made his professional football debut on 29 August 1979 with Sparta Rotterdam. He stayed under contract with Sparta for seven seasons when in July 1986 he transferred to Ajax, attracted there by manager Johan Cruyff. Blind's signing, however, was much to the chagrin of Ajax superstar Marco van Basten, who was upset that his manager had brought in a relatively unknown, defensive player from a fairly small club like Sparta, instead of splashing out on a big-money, big-name transfer. With Ajax, Blind amassed an impressive trophy list, winning all three European trophies (UEFA Cup Winners' Cup in 1987, the UEFA Cup in 1992 and the UEFA Champions League in 1995). He also secured the Intercontinental Cup in 1995 against Brazil's Grêmio by scoring the winning penalty in the penalty shoot-out.

Blind was again a penalty hero when he converted twice against Real Zaragoza in the European Super Cup Final of 1995, which Ajax won 5–1 over the two legs. The two penalties Blind converted were in the 65th and 69th minutes of the second leg.

Domestically, with Ajax, he won five Dutch Eredivisie Championships and four national cups. He retired on 16 May 1999.

Blind was known for being a solid, dependable defender and a leader on the field. However, he was also a technically gifted and cultured player who could pass and strike the ball well for a non-attacking player. Whilst famous for being a centre back, Blind started his career as a right full-back.

International career
Blind gained 42 caps for the Netherlands over a ten-year period, scoring once against Greece in a UEFA Euro 1992 qualifier. He made his debut in 1986 against Scotland but was not capped at all in 1987 or 1988, an absence which meant he missed being a part of the triumphant UEFA Euro 1988 side. He did, however, appear at the 1990 and 1994 World Cups and the 1992 and 1996 European Championships, retiring after the latter.

Management career
Blind was head coach at Ajax from 14 March 2005 (appointed as successor to Ronald Koeman) until 10 May 2006, after only 422 days in charge. He led Ajax to victory in the KNVB Cup and the Johan Cruyff Shield.

In 2007–08, Blind became director of football at his old club, Sparta Rotterdam. On 15 May 2008, he returned to Ajax to become the new director of football in Amsterdam but switched roles when Martin Jol joined the club to assistant coach. Moving to the position of technical director for Ajax at the beginning of the 2011–12 season, on 9 February 2012 it was announced that Blind would retire from his duties as technical director at Ajax, concluding a heated dispute surrounding the club's board of directors.

On 1 July 2015, Blind was named Guus Hiddink's successor as head coach of the Dutch national team. He failed to lead them to Euro 2016, and he put the 2018 World Cup qualifying campaign at stake after more meagre results. He was sacked by the Dutch FA on 26 March 2017, the day after losing 2–0 away at Bulgaria, which left their chances of qualification in serious doubt.

On 4 August 2021, Blind returned to the Dutch national team. He is Ronald Koeman's assistant coach.

Personal life
Blind is the father of professional footballer Daley Blind, who has played for Ajax and Manchester United. His son is also a Dutch international, and is one of their ten most featured players of all time with over 90 caps.

Career statistics

Managerial statistics

Honours

Player 
Ajax
Eredivisie: 1989–90, 1993–94, 1994–95, 1995–96, 1997–98
KNVB Cup: 1987, 1993, 1998, 1999
Johan Cruyff Shield: 1993, 1994
UEFA Champions League: 1995
UEFA Cup Winners' Cup: 1987
UEFA Cup: 1992
UEFA Super Cup: 1995
Intercontinental Cup: 1995
Individual
 Dutch Golden Shoe: 1995, 1996
 ESM Team of the Year: 1994–95, 1995–96
 Intercontinental Cup Most Valuable Player of the Match Award: 1995

Manager 
Ajax
 KNVB Cup: 2006
 Johan Cruyff Shield: 2005

See also
 List of players to have won all international club competitions
 List of players to have won the three main European club competitions

Notes

References

External links

1961 births
Living people
Sportspeople from Vlissingen
Association football defenders
Dutch footballers
Netherlands international footballers
Sparta Rotterdam players
AFC Ajax players
1990 FIFA World Cup players
UEFA Euro 1992 players
1994 FIFA World Cup players
UEFA Euro 1996 players
Eredivisie players
Dutch football managers
AFC Ajax managers
AFC Ajax non-playing staff
Eredivisie managers
Netherlands national football team managers
UEFA Champions League winning players
UEFA Cup winning players
Footballers from Zeeland
Association football coaches